The Girl Guides Association of Saint Christopher and Nevis is the national Guiding organization of Saint Kitts and Nevis. It serves 290 members (as of 2008). Founded in 1931, the girls-only organization became an associate member of the World Association of Girl Guides and Girl Scouts in 1993.

Sources

See also
The Scout Association of Saint Kitts and Nevis

World Association of Girl Guides and Girl Scouts member organizations
Scouting and Guiding in Saint Kitts and Nevis
Youth organizations established in 1931
1930s establishments in Saint Kitts and Nevis